Sun Pharmaceutical Industries Limited (d/b/a Sun Pharma) is an Indian multinational pharmaceutical company headquartered in Mumbai, that manufactures and sells pharmaceutical formulations and active pharmaceutical ingredients (APIs) in more than 100 countries across the globe. It is the largest pharmaceutical company in India and the fourth largest specialty generic pharmaceutical company in the world. The products cater to a vast range of therapeutic segments covering psychiatry, anti-infectives, neurology, cardiology, diabetology, gastroenterology, ophthalmology, nephrology, urology, dermatology, gynaecology, respiratory, oncology, dental and nutritionals. Its active pharmaceutical products include baricitinib, brivaracetam, and dapaglifozin.

History

Sun Pharmaceuticals was founded by Dilip Shanghvi in 1983 in Vapi, Gujarat, with five products to treat psychiatry ailments. Cardiology products were introduced in 1987 followed by gastroenterology products in 1989. Today it is ranked number one by prescriptions with nine different specialties of doctors in India and a market leader in cardiology, gastroenterology, ortho, diabetology, dermatology, urology, vitamins, minerals, and nutrients.

The 2014 acquisition of Ranbaxy made Sun Pharma the largest pharma company in India, the largest Indian pharma company in the US, and the 4th largest specialty generic company globally.

Over 72% of Sun Pharma sales are from markets outside India, primarily in the United States. The US is the single largest market, accounting for about 30% of the company's turnover; in all, formulations or finished dosage forms, account for 93% of the turnover. Manufacturing is across 44 global locations in India, the US, Asia, Africa, Australia and Europe. In the United States, the company markets a large basket of generics, with a strong pipeline awaiting approval from the U.S. Food and Drug Administration (FDA).

Sun Pharma was listed on the stock exchange in 1994 in an issue oversubscribed 55 times. The founding family continues to hold a majority stake in the company.

Acquisitions and Joint Ventures

Sun Pharma has complemented growth with select acquisitions over the last two decades. In 1996, Sun purchased a bulk drug manufacturing plant at Ahmednagar from Knoll Pharmaceuticals and MJ Pharma's dosage plant at Halol that are both U.S. FDA approved today. In 1997, Sun Pharma acquired Tamil Nadu Dadha Pharmaceuticals Limited (TDPL) based in Chennai, mainly for their extensive gynaecology and oncology brands. Also in 1997, Sun Pharma initiated their first foray into the lucrative US market with the acquisition of Caraco Pharmaceuticals, based in Detroit.

In 1998, Sun acquired a number of respiratory brands from Natco Pharma. Other notable acquisitions include Milmet Labs and Gujarat Lyka Organics (1999), Pradeep Drug Company (2000), Phlox Pharma (2004), a formulation plant at Bryan, Ohio and ICN, Hungary from Valeant Pharma and Able Labs (2005), and Chattem Chemicals (2008). In 2010, the company acquired a large stake in Taro Pharmaceuticals, amongst the largest generic dermatology companies in the US, with operations across Canada and Israel. The company currently owns ~ 69% stake in Taro, for about $260 million.

In 2011, Sun Pharma entered into a joint venture with MSD to bring complex or differentiated generics to emerging markets (other than India).

In 2012, Sun announced acquisitions of two US companies: DUSA Pharmaceuticals, a dermatology device company; and generic pharma company URL Pharma  In 2013, the company announced an R&D joint venture for ophthalmology with the research company, Intrexon.

On 6 April 2014, Sun Pharma acquired Ranbaxy in a US$4 billion landmark transaction to create the world's 5th largest specialty generic pharmaceutical company.

Then Sun Pharma entered into a licensing agreement with Merck & Co. Inc. for Tildrakizumab (MK- 3222) in order to further strengthen the specialty product pipeline.

To access sterile injectable capacity in the US, it acquired Pharmalucence in the US in the same year.

In December 2014, the Competition Commission of India approved Sun Pharma's $3.2 billion bid to buy Ranbaxy Laboratories, but ordered the firms to divest seven products to ensure the deal doesn't harm competition.

In March 2015, Sun Pharma announced it had agreed to buy GlaxoSmithKline's opiates business in Australia to strengthen its pain management portfolio.

The following year Sun Pharma made some significant acquisitions, including 14 brands from Novartis in Japan to enter the Japanese market.

It acquired Ocular Technologies, Sarl to strengthen its branded ophthalmic portfolio and also acquired Biosintez to enhance its presence in the Russian market.

From 2016 to 2018, Sun Pharma launched some of its new products in the USA. It launched its first branded ophthalmic product, BromSite™ in 2016. In 2017, the company launched its specialty product Odomzo and then in 2018 another specialty product Ilumya™ (tildrakizumab-asmn) was launched to treat moderate-to-severe plaque psoriasis.

In 2019, Sun Pharma acquired Pola Pharma in Japan to strengthen its global dermatology presence. The company entered the Greater China market by partnering with China Medical System Holdings as well as launched a speciality product, Cequa, in the United States for the treatment of dry eyes.

SPARC
In 2007, Sun Pharma demerged its innovative R&D arm, and listed it separately on the stock market as the Sun Pharma Advanced Research Company Ltd.. In 2013, SPARC declared revenue of ₹873 million. SPARC focuses on new chemical entities (NCE) research and new drug delivery systems and offers an annual update of its pipeline (NDDS).

Awards 
Sun Pharma stood second in the India's Most Reputed Brands (Pharmaceutical) list  in a study conducted by BlueBytes, a leading Media Analytics firm in association with TRA Research, a brand insights organization (both a part of the Comniscient Group).

2019

 Listed among the Forbes "World's Best Regarded Companies"

  CSR subsidiary Foundation for Disease Elimination and Control of India conferred with Mahatma Award for Social Good 2019

 Mobile Healthcare Unit project recognised as the Best Public Health Initiative by ACEF Asian Leadership Forum

2020
 Listed among the Forbes World's Best Employers 2020

 Volini named in Nielsen BASES Top Breakthrough Innovation Winners India 2020 list

2021
 Received the Golden Peacock Award for Corporate Social Responsibility, 2020

 Won the Dun & Bradstreet India Corporate Award under the Sectoral Performance-based category- Pharmaceuticals

 Bagged the Distribution Industry Award for Notable Achievements in Healthcare (DIANA) award for ‘Best New Product Introduction/Promotion’ at the Annual Healthcare Distribution Alliance Conference 2021

 Recognized as the Best Innovative Company of the Year 2021 at Indo-American Corporate Excellence Awards

References

 
BSE SENSEX
Indian brands
Pharmaceutical companies of India
Vaccine producers
NIFTY 50
Indian companies established in 1983
1983 establishments in Gujarat
Companies listed on the National Stock Exchange of India
Companies listed on the Bombay Stock Exchange